Bahay na bato (Tagalog, literally "house of stone", also known in Visayan as balay na bato or balay nga bato; in Spanish as Casa Filipino) is a type of building originating during the Philippines' Spanish colonial period. It is an updated version of the traditional bahay kubo of the Christianized lowlanders, known for its use of masonry in its construction, using stone and brick materials and later synthetic concrete, rather than just full organic materials of the former style. Its design has evolved throughout the ages, but still maintains the bahay kubo's architectural principle, which is adapted to the tropical climate, stormy season, and earthquake-prone environment of the whole archipelago of the Philippines, and fuses it with the influence of Spanish colonizers and Chinese traders. It is one of the many architecture throughout the Spanish Empire known as Arquitectura mestiza. The style is a hybrid of Austronesian, Spanish, and Chinese; and later, with early 20th-century American architecture, supporting the fact that the Philippines is a result of these cultures mixing together. Its most common appearance features an elevated, overhanging wooden upper story (with balustrades, ventanillas, and capiz shell sliding windows) standing on wooden posts in a rectangular arrangement as a foundation. The posts are placed behind Spanish-style solid stone blocks or bricks giving the impression of a first floor, but the ground level is actually storage rooms, cellars, shops, or other business-related functions. The second floor is the elevated residential apartment, as it is with the bahay kubo. The roof materials either tiled or thatched (nipa, sago palm, or cogon), with later 19th-century designs featuring galvanization. Roof styles, traditionally high pitched with, or gable roof, Hip roof, East Asian Hip roof, simplier East Asian hip-and-gable roof, Horses for carriages were housed in stables called caballerizas.

It was popular among the elite or middle-class. The 19th century was the golden age of these houses, when wealthy Filipinos built them all over the archipelago. 

The same architectural style was used for Spanish-era convents, monasteries, schools, hotels, factories, and hospitals, and with some of the American-era Gabaldon school buildings, all with few adjustments. This architecture was still used during the American colonization of the Philippines. After the Second World War, construction of these houses declined and eventually stopped in favor of post-World War II modern architecture.

Today, these houses are more commonly called ancestral houses, due to most ancestral houses in the Philippines being of bahay na bato architecture.

Etymology 
Though the Filipino term bahay na bato means "house of stone", these houses are not fully made up of stone; some are dominated more by wooden materials, while some more modern ones use concrete materials, in contrast to the organic materials that make up the bahay kubo. The name was applied to the architecture over generations.

History 

Precolonial Philippine architecture is based on the traditional stilt houses of the Austronesian people of Southeast Asia. The first buildings during the early years of Spanish occupation were of wood and bamboo, materials with which the pre-Hispanic indigenous Filipinos had been working expertly since early times known as bahay kubo (later named by the Americans as "nipa hut"). Bahay kubo roofs were made of nipa palm or cogon grass. In its most basic form, the house consisted of four walls enclosing one or more rooms, with the whole structure raised above ground on stilts.

The Spaniards then quickly introduced the idea of building more permanent communities with the church and government center as a focal points. By the mid-1580s, through the efforts of Domingo Salazar, the first bishop of Manila, and of the Jesuit Antonio Sedeño, edifices began to be constructed of stone. Fr. Sedeño built the first stone building, which was the residence of Bishop Salazar.

By 1587, Governor General Santiago de Vera required all buildings in Manila to be built of stone. For this purpose, the Chinese and the indigenous Filipinos were taught how to quarry and dress stone, how to prepare and use mortar, and how to mold bricks. Thus began what has been called the first golden age of building in stone. This new community setup made construction using heavier, more permanent materials desirable. Some of these materials included bricks, mortar, tiles and stone. Glowing accounts of towering palaces and splendid mansions reached the peninsula. However, the ambitious plans of the Spaniards were dashed in 1645 when a terrible earthquake struck Manila.The twin dangers of fire and earthquake gave rise to another type of architecture. Finding European construction styles impractical in local conditions, Spanish and Filipino builders quickly adapted the characteristics of the bahay kubo of the natives and applied it to Spanish Colonial architecture. This type of construction was soon called bahay na bato or as Jesuit Ignacio Alzina calls it, "arquitectura mestiza" or “mixed architecture”.

Under more than three centuries of Spanish initiative, buildings of wood, stone, and brick were constructed all over the archipelago, from the Batanes Islands in the north to Tawi-Tawi in the south, from Palawan in the west to Samar in the east.

During World War II, many of these houses were destroyed by both the American and Japanese forces.

Styles 
Different styles depend on each house's individual appearance. For example, some bahay na bato do not have ventanillas, some do not have Capiz windows, and some lack both. Some have galvanized roofs, some have tiled roofs, and some have nipa or cogon roofs. Ground level walls may be made of bricks, adobe, coral, or wood; modern structures typically use concrete. Although retaining the basic form, the 19th-century bahay na bato reflected changing tastes through the incorporation of motifs from the prevalent styles.

Houses such as the Vega Ancestral House that have emerging stone works at the bottom part of the house but have almost wooden materials appearance even to the first level walls are still considered bahay na bato; the name bahay na bato was applied to this architecture over generations, as most of these houses use stone materials, contrary to the precolonial era that used little to no stones at all. The same principle applies to the nipa hut: not all nipa huts use nipa materials; some use cogon.

Though many houses are built in standard design, many houses are also mixed, arranged, patterned and/or coated with varieties of designs from different architectural styles from cultures connected to the Philippines, by any means, including, Chinese, Romanesque and Classical etc. These houses could have an unprecedented mixing and matching of architectural styles, such that it can have Neogothic and Neo-Mudéjar or Moorish Revival details in the same corners – that is, on top of the Baroque. Although retaining the basic form, the 19th-century bahay na bato reflected changing tastes through the incorporation of motifs from prevalent styles such as Victorian, Renaissance Revival and Neoclassical decorations which included columns, pilasters, caryatids, atlases and friezes adopted from Greco-Roman architecture, the civilizations from which Spanish culture descend. Classical traditions in these houses also appeared in Beaux-Arts later in history. The dawn of Art Nouveau was also a great influence on the mixing of styles and aesthetics of these houses. Many later bahay na bato adapted design styles such as Art Deco during the latter era of American rule, and even through the postwar period of loose restoration. These mixes give the bahay na bato a distinct architectural style reflective of the Philippines' multicultural heritage and society.

Regional variants 
The style of bahay na bato may also vary by area. Each region evolved its own building style, which were in many cases dependent on the materials available. As construction techniques were developed, quarries opened, and kilns constructed, various parts of the country began to show a preference for specific building materials. As a result, bahay na bato have several variations along ethnic lines. The bahay na bato in Cebu, for example, differs from the one in Ilocos and so on.

Metro Manila 
Manila, the capital of the Philippines, has some of the most diverse styles and materials of bahay na bato, ranging from the early period of Spanish colonization to the American era. Many were destroyed by World War II. However, the Metro Manila area still has one of the largest concentrations of bahay na bato houses. Most buildings in Manila and Central Luzon were of adobe, a volcanic tuff quarried from the hills, which is entirely different from the material of the same name found in Latin America (adobe in those Hispanic countries refers to mud and straw formed into rectangular blocks which are then dried in the sun).

In Manila, the largest, fanciest, and most prestigious companies eventually established themselves along the Escolta; by the second half of the 19th century it was the most important commercial district in the country. The opening of Manila as a free port encouraged British people, Germans, French people, and other foreigners to set up businesses on the Escolta and adjacent streets, and majestic bahay na bato buildings were built.

Northern Luzon 
Northern Luzon has some of the best preserved bahay na bato in the whole Philippines. The unique style of the north, commonly in the Ilocos Region, usually bases its design on brick materials. This material is commonly used in bahay na bato, churches and other constructed buildings, walls, monuments and fortification of the region.

Brick was the essential building material in northern Luzon; houses and churches of brick were also built in scattered areas of the archipelago, all the way down to Jolo, Sulu. Unique designs of the north may include having the façade walls of the second level made up of stone material in many buildings, rather than the more common wooden second level façade in the rest of the country. However, buildings built in this style in the region still remain faithful to the nipa hut principle. These non-wooden (stone) second level façade walls style are also present in some of the bahay na bato of other regions besides the north, like the 1730 Jesuit house of Cebu in Visayas. The wooden second level façade bahay na bato are still present in the north.

In Vigan, the capital of Ilocos Sur, many home owners chose to build both stories in brick, which was available in large quantities. With the massive walls, the volada (an overhanging balcony) disappeared in many residences, and the kitchen became an extension in stone, with vents piercing the walls to let out smoke.

Calabarzon 
Calabarzon is a region with some of the most thoroughly-preserved heritage houses, built mostly using adobe stones. Towns along the coasts of Luzon, especially in Batangas, used roughly hewn blocks of coral and adobe stone.

Central Luzon 
The bahay na bato in Bulacan and many in Central Luzon are famous for their carvings. The most notable ones are in the Malolos, in its heritage core, where ancestral houses are located. Since adobe lends itself to sculpture, houses in Bulacan had façades decorated with carved flowers, leaves, and religious symbols.

Bicol 
Many constructions in the Bicol peninsula took advantage of the abundant volcanic stone sourced from nearby volcanoes. One characteristic of houses in Bicol is that ground floor overhangs are common considering the rainy climate of the region. Decorations tend to be minimal for these houses. Larger towns in Bicol boast a decent number of bahay na bato homes.

Visayan 
Most bahay na bato in Visayas uses coral stone material though many are still adobe and bricks. Cebu, Bohol, Negros and Iloilo are famous for their bahay na bato houses. Throughout the Visayas, the craft of cutting stone or coral was virtually elevated into a fine art, with blocks fitting so precisely into each other that not even a razor blade could be inserted between blocks. The material was so durable that it did not have to be protected with a layer of paletada. Aside from bahay na bato Visayan noble settlements are also dominated by mansion-type payag (bahay kubo), which forms like a bahay na bato but uses wooden wall instead of stone walls covering the bottom floor. These arts was brought by the Visayan settlers to the coastal towns of Mindanao.

Batanes 
The Ivatan people of Batanes have a very different style of bahay na bato. As the islands of Batanes were absorbed to the colonial Philippines much later through Spanish conquest, their bahay na bato developed much later as well. Structures combined the pre-colonial Ivatan-style (presumably the jin-jin) and colonial Filipino-style bahay na bato, particularly the northern style from Ilocos and Cagayan, but with the use of thick limestone blocks instead of the bricks traditionally used in the northern mainland. In addition, structures incorporated practical methods suitable to their unique environment prone to destructive typhoons. Their variant styles include the common sinadumparan, which is similar to the mainland bahay na bato, having storage areas below and living quarters above. However, the storage floor is partially underground, acting as a basement, and the first floor serves as living quarters, appearing as a one-story house. The rakuh style however upholds the mainland tradition of having the first floor as storage and the second floor as living quarters, appearing as a two-storey house. The mainland bahay na bato influence is very much clear in the rakuh building.

Other buildings 
Many convents, monasteries, schools, hospitals, offices, stations, etc. also adapted the bahay kubo architecture to the Spanish colonial style. As a result, many of these buildings ends up being a bahay na bato as well.

Examples of such buildings include the University of Santo Tomas (Intramuros), Colegio de Santa Rosa Manila campus, San Juan de Dios Educational Foundation, Tutuban station, AMOSUP hospital, Hotel de Oriente in Binondo, Malacañang Palace, and many other church convents which are still standing today.

Examples:

Parts of a bahay na bato 
As with any vernacular architecture, different features of bahay na bato vary from building to building, and houses may have or lack certain elements from the following list:

 Accessoria – Apartment-type dwelling characterized by common party walls shared by adjoining units with a separate door in front of each
 Aljibe – Cistern
 Anta
 Antesal – Caida
 Aparador de tres lunas – Armoire with three sections
 Arko – Arch
 Azotea – Open-air balcony beside the kitchen that housed a cistern (aljibe) and the bathroom, and was usually a work area
 Atlas, atlantes – A column, pilaster and other decorative features in the shape of a man
 Balconaje, Balcon – Balcony
Banggera – A wooden dish rack that extends outside the kitchen window. After the dishes are washed, they are placed here to be air-dried. The inverted cups are placed on the ends of the wooden sticks and the plates are placed in between or above the slats. On the far left is a tapayan/banga, an earthenware jar that keeps water cool.
 Bañera – Bathtub
 Baño – Bathroom
 Barandillas – railing or balustrade (usually wooden)
 Barrigones – "Buntis" (or bombere, pregnant) grillwork on windows, to accommodate planters
 Batalan – Rear part of house used for washing and water storage, with a flooring often made of slatted bamboo; more a part of a bahay kubo (but may be present as well at the rear of a bahay na bato)
 Baul mond – Traveling trunk
 Bentwood beech chairs and other furniture – Imported dark wood furniture
 Brackets – Series of often diagonal braces placed in support of the volada on the second floor
 Butaka – A version of silla perezosa with no leg rests
 Caida – Landing on the upper entrance hall; foyer of the second floor; also called "antesala"
 Calado – Lace-style fretwork or latticework used to adorn room dividers and to allow air to circulate
 Capilla – Long bench, a staple item in the caida
Capital – Topmost member of a column (or pilaster) mediating between the column and the load"

 Capiz windows – Typically sliding window made of capiz shells cut into squares

 

 Caryatid – A sculpted female figure serving as an architectural support taking the place of a Pilaster, column or a pillar etc. supporting an entablature on her head

 Clerestory – Any high windows above eye level for the purpose of bringing outside light, fresh air, or both into the inner space
Cocina – Kitchen, which was typically built separately from the house
Colonette – A small, thin decorative column supporting a beam (horizontal timber) or lintel (beam spanning a door or window)
Comedor – Dining room
 Comun – Toilet; also called "latrina"
Corbel – A projection jutting out from a wall to support a structure above it; also "braces"
 Cornice – A ledge or generally any horizontal decorative molding that crowns a building or furniture element
Court, courtyard – A space enclosed by walls and is open to the sky; has azotea or balconaje
 Cuartos – Rooms
 Cuatro aguas – Hip roof, which has more corners and angles, making it stronger than the dos aguas (gable) or high-pitched roof due to stronger aerodynamics (i.e., more wind resistance); also has the advantage of providing an overhang, which is effective for protecting the house from rainwater and from direct sunlight
 Dapugan – A platform in the kitchen where the kalan or clay stove is placed
 Despacho – Office; also "oficina"
 Dispensa – Pantry
 Dos aguas – Gable or high-pitched roof
Dougong – A simplified and localized version of the ones in China
 Eave – Bottom edge of a roof

 Engaged column – Column in support of the roof above

 Entresuelo – Mezzanine; literally meaning "between floors", this is the area where clients, tenants or estate managers (if the owner was a rich landowner) wait before being admitted to the oficina (office)

 Escalera – Stairway
 Escritorio – A large chest of drawers, commonly adorned with inlay work
 Estante – Dining room cabinet where chinaware and silverware are displayed
Facade – Front
 Finial – A usually foliated ornament forming an upper extremity
 Fresquera – Storage room for salted food, etc.; placed on the wall of the house facing outside
Gable – The part of a wall that encloses the end of a pitched roof 
 Gallinera – Literally, "chicken seat"; "usually found outside the oficina of a landowner; coming from the Spanish word 'gallo' (chicken), this church bench-inspired settee is used for farmers to place chickens on the cage underneath in exchange for paying cash" (Old Manila Nostalgia blog)
Gargoyle – A carved stone grotesque with a spout designed to convey water from a roof and away from the side of a building, thereby preventing rainwater from running down masonry walls and eroding the mortar between
 Gingerbread trim, running trim – 19th century Victorian style of fancifully cut and pierced frieze boards, scrolled brackets, sawn balusters, and braced arches, to transform simple frame cottages into one-of-a-kind homes; usually attached to the eaves to make it more decorative and to curving iron rods that help support the media agua
 Kama – Four-poster bed
 Kama ni Ah Tay – A once popular signature four-poster bed design that was carved by a famous Chinese furniture maker named Eduardo Ah Tay. To have this bed was considered a symbol of status during the Spanish era.
 Kantoneras (brackets) – Either plain calado cut-outs or fully carved embellishments usually placed where beams and columns intersect especially under the soffit or overhanging ceiling outside house; also seen to decorate door or window openings, hallways or simply dividing spaces
 Lansenas – Kitchen sideboards
 Latrina – Comun
 Load-bearing wall – Wall used in place of posts to bear weight
Machuca tiles (formerly known as "baldozas mosaicas") – colorful Mediterranean-style cement tiles used for the zaguan flooring, often in harlequin pattern; manufactured by the Machuca company; another brand is Majolica
 Mascaron – An architectural ornament representing a face or head, human or animal, that is often grotesque or frightening

 Media aguas – Canopy or roof shed, consisting of a piece of metal roof that protects the window from rain or heat; not to be confused with awning

 Mirador – Lighthouse; lookout tower
 Moulding, molding – A strip of material (such as wood or metal) with some design or pattern that is used as a decoration on a wall, on the edge of a table, etc.
 Oratorio – Prayer room with an altar of Christ, the Virgin Mary, and the saints
Painted metal sheet ceiling – Pressed tin or copper ceiling from maybe late Victorian to early American colonial period, to prevent decay by moisture or worms (or even mouse)
 Paminggalan – A cabinet where leftover food and preserves are stored. The doors of the cabinet have slats so that it can absorb air and room temperature inside. To avoid ants from coming up and getting to the food, the legs of the cabinet are placed on containers filled with kerosene or any liquid.
 Pasamano – Window ledge
 Persiana – Louver window
 Piedra china – Chinese stone used to pave the floor of the zaguan
Pilaster – False pillar used to give the appearance of a supporting column and to articulate an extent of wall, with only an ornamental function

 Platera – Aparador or cabinet for kitchenware (chiefly china)
 Porte cochere – Horse carriage porch or portico at the main entrance
 Portico – "(From Italian) a porch leading to the entrance of a building, or extended as a colonnade, with a roof structure over a walkway, supported by columns or enclosed by walls"
 Puerta – "Door of the entrada principal (main entrance)"
 Puertita – "small cut door that is part of the puerta"
 Pugon – Clay oven
 Punkah – Ceiling cloth fan
 Sala mayor – Main living room, place for late-afternoon parties called tertulias and dances called "bailes"
 Sala menor – Secondary living room
 Sillas americanas – "American chairs, considered the Monobloc chairs of their time (due to ubiquity)"
 Silla perezosa – Lazy chair
 Solihiya – Typical wicker weave pattern in furniture
 Stained glass – "Glass colored or stained (as by fusing metallic oxides into it) for decorative applications (as in windows)"
Transom – "Transverse horizontal structural beam or bar" often in floral tracery design
Trompe-l'œil – "A style of painting in which things are painted in a way that makes them look like real objects"
 Tumba-tumba – Philippine rocking chair
Tympanum – triangular decorative wall surface over an entrance, door or window
 Valance – "A length of decorative drapery hung above a window to screen the curtain fittings"
 Ventana – "Wooden window panel that uses a grid pattern with flattened Capiz shell pane"; often in sliding style, as opposed to flinging out
 Ventanilla – Literally 'small window'; "sliding panels between the floor and windows" to allow more air and light; "usually protected by balustrades which can either be wooden or wrought iron grills"
 Volada – "An enclosed overhanging balcony"; "a gallery (along the elaborate system of windows) which protects the rooms from the heat of the sun"
 Yerong pukpok – Gingerbread trim
 Zaguan – Ground floor (literally "passageway" in Arabic) to accommodate horse carriages and carrozas (processional carriages)

See also 
Culture of the Philippines
 Architecture of the Philippines
 Ancestral houses
 Bahay kubo
 Earthquake Baroque
 Torogan
History of the Philippines (1565–1898)

Colonial architecture of Southeast Asia

 Sino-Portuguese architecture
 Shophouse

Rumah adat
 Rumah melayu
Spanish colonial architecture

Chinese architecture

 Hokkien architecture

Citations

References 

 Ahlborn, Richard. "Spanish-Philippine Churches: An Interpretation." Exchange News Quarterly (October–December 1958).
 . "The Spanish Churches of Central Luzon (I)." Philippine Studies, Vol. VIII (October 1960), 802–813.
 El Archipielago. Washington DC: Government Printing Press, 1900.
 Bañas, Raymundo C. A Brief Sketch of Philippine Catholic Churches. Manila: The Author, 1937.
 Castañeda, Dominador. Art in the Philippines. Quezon City: University of the Philippines, 1964.
 "Christian Beginnings in Ilocandia." Ilocos Review, Vol. II, Nos. 1–2 (January December 1971).
 Cordero-Fernando, Gilda, ed. "The House With No Nails." In Turn of the Century. Manila: GCF Books, 1978.
 Coseteng, Alicia M.L. Spanish Churches in the Philippines. Manila: Mercury Press, 1972.
 Diaz-Trechuelo, Lourdes. Arquitectura Española en Filipinas (1565–1800). Sevilla: Escuela de Estudios Hispano-Americanos de Sevilla, 1959.
 Galende, Pedro. Angels in Stone: The Architecture of Augustinian Churches in the Philippines. Manila: C. Formoso Publishing, 1987.
 Gomez Piñol, Emilio. Aspectos generales de la relacion entre el arte Indo Portugues y el Hispano Filipino. Seminario de Historia de America: Universidad de Sevilla, 1973.
 Gonzales, Jose Ma. Labor evangelica y civilizadora de los religiosos Dominicos en Pangasinan (1587–1898). Manila: University of Santo Tomas Press, 1946.
 Gonzales, Julio. The Batanes Islands. Manila: University of Santo Tomas Press, 1969.
 Hargrove, Thomas R. "Submerged Spanish-Era Towns in Lake Taal, Philippines: An Underwater and Archival Investigation of a Legend." International Journal of Nautical Archaeology and Underwater Exploration, Vol. XV, No. 4 (1986): 323–337.
 Hargrove, Thomas R. The Mysteries of Taal. Manila: Bookmark Inc., 1991.
 Hornedo, Florentino H. "The Tumauini Church: Praise of Sublime Labor in Clay." Filipino Times, February 23 – March 1 and March 2–8, 1987, 1, 5, 7 and 1, 6 respectively.
 Huerta, Felix de. Estado geografico, topografico, estadistico, historico-religioso de la santa y apostolica provincia de San Gregorio Magno. Manila: Imprenta de los Amigos del Pais, 1855.
 Javellana, Rene. Wood and Stone for God's Greater Glory: Jesuit Art and Architecture in the Philippines. Quezon City: Ateneo de Manila University Press, 1991.
 Jorde, Elviro P. Catalogo de los religiosos perteniente a la provincia del Smo. Nombre de Jesus de Filipinas desde su fundacion hasta nuestros dias. Manila: 1901.
 Jose, Regalado Trota. "How to Recognize Rococo Art." Art Collector (September 1984).
 . "Felix Roxas and the Gothicizing of Earthquake Baroque." 1030 Hidalgo. Vol. II. Manila: MARA Inc., 1986, 7–26.
 . Simbahan: Church Art in Colonial Philippines, 1565–1898. Makati: Ayala Museum, 1991.
 Kelemen, Pal. Baroque and Rococo in Latin America. 1st ed. New York: The MacMillan Company, 1951. 2nd ed. New York: Dover Publications Inc., 1967.
 . Art of the Americas—Ancient and Hispanic, with a Comparative Chapter on the Philippines. New York: Thomas Y. Crowell Company, 1969.
 Kubler, George and Martin Soria. Art and Architecture in Spain and Portugal and their American Dominions 1500 to 1800. Great Britain: Penguin Books Ltd., 1959.
 Klassen, Winand. Architecture in the Philippines: Filipino Building in a Cross Cultural Context. Cebu City: University of San Carlos, 1986.
 Legarda, Benito F. "Angels in Clay: The Typical Cagayan Church Style." Filipinas Journal of Science and Culture, Vol. II. Makati: Filipinas Foundation, 1981.
 Lopez, Renato. "History of Santa Barbara in Pangasinan during the Spanish Time."  Ilocos Review, Vol. XVI (1984): 75–133.
 Marco Dorta, Enrique. Arte en America y Filipinas Ars Hispaniae: Historia Universal del Arte Hispanico. 21 Madrid: Editorial Plus-Ultra, 1973.
 Merino, Luis. Arquitectura y urbanismo en el siglo XIX, estudios sobre el municipio de Manila. Vol. II. Manila: Centro Cultural de España and the Intramuros Administration, 1987.
 Mojares, Resil B. Casa Gorodo in Cebu—Urban Residence in a Philippine Province, 1860–1920. Cebu: Ramon Aboitiz Foundation Inc., 1983.
 Niño, Andres G. San Agustin of Manila. Manila: The Augustinian Monastery, 1975.
 Orlina, Paulina Gahol. Taal. n.d., 1976. Brochure.
 Pigafetta, Antonio. "First Voyage Around the World" (1525). In The Philippine Islands: 1493–1898. Vol. XXXIII, 27–267. Edited by Emma Helen Blair and James Alexander Robertson. Cleveland, Ohio: A.H. Clark Co., 1903–1909. Reprinted, Mandaluyong, Rizal: Cacho Hermanos, 1973.
 Reed, Robert R. Colonial Manila. The Context of Hispanic Urbanism and Process of Morphogenesis. Berkeley: University of California Press, 1978.
 Repetti, William C. Pictorial Records and Traces of the Society of Jesus in the Philippine Islands and Guam Prior to 1768. Manila: Manila Observatory, 1938.
 Roces, Alfredo R., ed. Filipino Heritage: The Making of a Nation. Vols. I-X. Manila: Lahing Pilipino Publishing Inc., 1977–1978.
 Rodriguez, Isacio R. The Augustinian Monastery of Intramuros. Translated by Pedro Galende. Makati: Colegio de San Agustin, 1976.
 Smith, Winfield Scott III, ed. Art of the Philippines, 1521–1957. Manila: The Art Association of the Philippines Inc., 1958.
 "Witnesses to Past Presences." Augustinian Mirror (April 1956), 41–58.
 Zialcita, Fernando N. and Martin I. Tinio Jr. Philippine Ancestral Houses 1810 1930. Quezon City: GCF Books, 1980.
 Zobel de Ayala, Fernando. Philippine Religious Imagery. Quezon City: Ateneo de Manila, 1963.

 
Houses in the Philippines